A small number of municipalities in Serbia held local elections in 2009. These were not part of the country's regular cycle of local elections but instead took place in certain jurisdictions where either the local government had fallen or the last local elections for four-year terms had taken place in 2005.

All local elections in 2009 were held under proportional representation. The direct election of mayors had been introduced in 2002 but was subsequently abandoned in 2007; in 2009, mayors were chosen by elected members of the local assemblies. Parties were required to cross a five per cent electoral threshold (of all votes, not only of valid votes), although this requirement was waived for parties representing national minority communities.

Results

Belgrade

Voždovac
The municipal assembly of Voždovac was dissolved on 5 March 2009, after the resignation in January of the municipality's mayor, Goran Lukačević, and the president of its municipal assembly. Lukačević continued to lead a provisional administration pending new elections, which took place on 7 June.

Parliamentarian Marina Raguš led the Radical Party's list and took a seat in the municipal assembly afterwards.

Post-election negotiations for a coalition government were not successful, and another municipal election was held on 6 December 2009.

Aleksandar Savić of the Progressive Party was chosen as mayor after the election.

Marina Raguš received the second position on the Radical Party's list.

Zemun
The municipal assembly of Zemun was dissolved on 5 March 2009, after the assembly failed to adopt its municipal statute by the required deadline. (There was also controversy over a number of disputed mandates claimed by the Radical Party.) Zdravko Stanković of the Democratic Party led a provisional authority pending new elections on 7 June.

Branislav Prostran of the Progressive Party was chosen as mayor after the election.

Vojvodina

Kovin
The Kovin municipal assembly was dissolved by the Serbian authorities on 8 November 2008 after it failed to adopt the country's new municipal statute. Sitting mayor Novica Mijatovič of the Movement for the Revival of Our Municipality list was removed from office, and Slavko Branković of the Democratic Party was appointed to lead a provisional administration. A new election was held on 5 April 2009.

Slavko Branković of the Democratic Party was confirmed as mayor after the election and served for a full four-year term.

Vrbas
The municipal government of Vrbas was dismissed in June 2009 following a breakdown in the local coalition and a non-functioning municipal assembly, and a new election was scheduled for 18 October 2009. Željko Vidović of the Democratic Party was appointed as the leader of a provisional administration prior to the election. An explosive device was detonated under his car shortly after he accepted this position, although no-one was in the vehicle at the time.

A new coalition government was formed after the election by the Democratic Party, the Socialist Party, and other parties. Željko Vidović was chosen as mayor. He resigned in 2012 and was replaced by Milan Stanimirović, also of the Democratic Party.

Central Serbia (excluding Belgrade)

Kosjerić
Željko Prodanović, a member of the Democratic Party of Serbia, was removed from office as mayor of Kosjerić on 26 February 2009, and a provisional administration was established with Milan Štulović of the Democratic Party as its leader. A new election was scheduled for 7 June 2009.

Dragan Vujadinović of the Democratic Party was chosen as mayor after the election, leading a coalition government that also included the alliance around the Socialist Party of Serbia, the Serbian Renewal Movement, and G17 Plus. In October 2012, a new governing coalition came to power with Milijan Stojanić of the Serbian Progressive Party as mayor.

References

Local elections in Serbia
2009 elections in Serbia